Lunkatanya is the Hungarian name for two villages in Romania:

 Lunca Meteşului village, Meteș Commune, Alba County
 Valea Luncii village, Mica Commune, Cluj County